"Lucy Gray" is a 1799 poem by William Wordsworth.

Lucy Gray may also refer to:

Lucy Gray (activist) (born 2006), New Zealand climate change activist
Lucy Gray (album), 2007 album by Envy on the Coast
Lucy Gray Baird, a character from the 2020 novel, The Ballad of Songbirds and Snakes
Lucy Gray, designer of the Laser Kiwi flag for the New Zealand flag referendums

See also
Lucy Gray Mountains, a mountain range in Nevada, United States